Krumhermersdorf is a village in the large county borough of Zschopau in the district Erzgebirgskreis in eastern Germany. It was first mentioned in the records in 1369.

Sources 
 
 Die Parochie Krumhermersdorf. in: Neue Sächsische Kirchengalerie, Ephorie Marienberg. Strauch Verlag, Leipzig, p. 365–384 (Digitalisat)

References

External links 
 private homepage for Krumhermersdorf
 http://www.suppenlaender.de/
 

Erzgebirgskreis
Zschopau